Vesyoly is a rural locality (a village) in Oktyabrsky Selsoviet, Sterlitamaksky District, Bashkortostan, Russia. The population was 296 as of 2010. There are 5 streets.

Geography 
Vesyoly is located 16 km southwest of Sterlitamak (the district's administrative centre) by road. Preobrazhenovka is the nearest rural locality.

References 

Rural localities in Sterlitamaksky District